Eastern Orthodox bishops in the United States and Canada are bishops of various Eastern Orthodox Churches serving in the United States and Canada. The list includes all bishops serving in those countries, whether as diocesan bishops or in some other capacity, for example: as auxiliary bishops, diocesan administrators, or heads of various exarchates and vicariates. The dates following their names indicate the years during which they served in the United States or Canada.

This list includes all bishops by service, regardless of their nationality (citizenship).

Church of Antioch
 Germanos (Shehadi) of Zahle

Antiochian Archdiocese
 Alexander (Mufarrij) of Ottawa, 2004–present
Anthony (Michaels) of Toledo, 2011–present
 Antony (Bashir) of New York, 1935-1966
Antoun (Khouri) of Miami, 1981-2017
 Basil (Essey) of Wichita, 1992–present
Demetri (Khoury) of Jableh, 1995-2003 (retired)
Joseph (Al-Zehlaoui) of Los Angeles, 1995–present
 Mark (Maymon) of Toledo, 2004-2010
 Michael (Shaheen) of Toledo, 1958-1992
Philip (Saliba) of New York, 1966-2014
 Samuel (David) of Toledo, 1935-1958
 Thomas (Joseph) of Oakland, 2004–present
 Victor (Abo-Assaley) of New York, 1924-1935

Church of Russia, 1794-1924
 Saint Tikhon (Belavin), Patriarch of Moscow, Apostle to America
 Vladimir (Sokolovsky-Avtonomov) of the Aleutians, 1888-1891
 Saint Innocent (Veniaminov) of Alaska, Equal to the Apostles and Enlightener of North America
 John (Mitropolsky) of the Aleutians, 1870-1877
 Nestor (Zass) of the Aleutians, 1878-1882
 Nicholas (Ziorov) of the Aleutians, 1891-1898
 Paul (Popov) of Novoarkhangelsk, 1867-1870
 Peter (Ekaterinovsky) of Novoarkhangelsk, 1859-1867
 Platon (Rozhdestvensky) of New York
 Saint Raphael (Hawaweeny) of Brooklyn, 1904-1915

Russian Exarchate of North America, 1933-1970
 Benjamin (Fedchenkov) of the Aleutians, 1933-1947
 Boris (Vik) of the Aleutians, 1955-1962
 Germogen, 1954
 John (Wendland) of New York and the Aleutians, 1962-1967
 Jonathan (Kopolovitch) of New York and the Aleutians, 1967-1970
 Makarius (Ilyinsky) of New York, 1947-1953

Russian Orthodox Church in the USA, 1970-present

Russian Orthodox Church Outside Russia  (partial) 
 Hilarion (Kapral), First Hierarch of the Russian Orthodox Church Outside of Russia and Metropolitan of Eastern America and New York, 2008–2022
 Kyrill (Dmitrieff), Archbishop of San Francisco and Western America, 2000–present
 Alypy (Gamanovich), Archbishop of Chicago and Mid-America
 Peter (Lukianoff) of Cleveland, Administrator of the Diocese of Chicago & Mid-America. Treasurer of the Synod of Bishops
 Theodosius (Ivashchenko), Bishop of Seattle, Vicar Bishop of the Diocese of San Francisco and Western America, 2008–present
 George (Schaefer) of Mayfield, Vicar Bishop of the Diocese of Eastern America and New York
 Jerome (Shaw) of Manhattan, Vicar Bishop of the Diocese of Eastern America and New York, Deputy Secretary of the Synod of Bishops
 Philaret (Voznesensky) Metropolitan 
 Vitaly (Ustinov) First Hierarch of the Russian Orthodox Church Outside Russia and Metropolitan of Eastern America and New York, 1986 - 2001
 Laurus (Škurla),First Hierarch of the Russian Orthodox Church Outside Russia and Metropolitan of Eastern America and New York, 2001 - 2008
 Saint John of Shanghai and San Francisco

Greek Orthodox Archdiocese of America
Anthimos (Drakonakis) of Olympus, Bishop of Christoupolis Sixth District (Pittsburg) 1977–1979, Bishop of Boston 1979-1983, Bishop of Denver 1984-1987, later assigned to Bishop of Olympus 1992-2015
 Alexander (Demoglou) of America, 1922-1930
 Alexios (Panagiotopoulos) of Atlanta, 1999–present
 Andonios (Paropoulos) of Phasiane, - present
 Anthony (Gergiannakis) of San Francisco, 1978-2004
 Athenagoras (Spyrou) of America, 1931-1949
 Demetrios (Kantzavelos) of Mokissos, -present
 Demetrios (Trakatellis) of America, 1999-2019
 Dimitrios (Couchell) of Xanthos, -present
 Evangelos (Kourounis) of New Jersey, -present
 Gerasimos (Michaleas) of San Francisco, 2005–present
 Iakovos (Coucouzis) of America, 1959-1996
 Iakovos (Garmatis) of Chicago, 1979–present
Isaiah (Chronopoulos) of Denver, 1992–present
 Maximos (Aghiorgoussis) of Pittsburgh, 1979-2011
 Methodios (Tournas) of Boston, 1983–present
 Michael (Konstantinides) of America, 1949-1959
 Nicholas (Pissare) of Detroit, 1999–present
 Philip (Koutoufas) of Atlanta, 1992-1996 
 Savas (Zembillas) of Troas, 2002–present
 Spyridon (Papageorge) of America, 1996-1999
 Timothy (Negropontis) of Detroit, 1979-1995

Northern American Metropolia/Orthodox Church in America 
 Platon (Rozhdestvensky) Archbishop of the Aleutians and North America (1907-1914). Later named Metropolitan of All America and Canada (1922-1934)
 Evdokim (Meschersky) Archbishop of the Aleutians and North America (1914-1918)
 Alexander (Nemolovsky) Archbishop of the Aleutians and North America (1919-1922)
 Theophilus (Pashkovsky) Archbishop of San Francisco, Metropolitan of All America and Canada (1934-1950)
 Leontius (Turkevich) Archbishop of New York, Metropolitan of All America and Canada (1950-1965)
 John (Shakhovskoy) Archbishop of San Francisco and the West (1950-1974)
 Irenaeus (Bekish) Archbishop of New York, Metropolitan of All America and Canada (1965-1977)
 Theodosius (Lazor) Archbishop of Washington, Metropolitan of All America and Canada (1977-2002)
 Herman (Swaiko) Archbishop of Washington and New York, Metropolitan of All America and Canada (2002-2008)
 Jonah (Paffhausen) Archbishop of Washington, Metropolitan of All America and Canada (2008-2012)
 Tikhon (Mollard) Archbishop of Washington, Metropolitan of All America and Canada (since 2012)

'Holy Synod of Bishops (2016)
 Tikhon (Mollard), Archbishop of Washington and Metropolitan of All America and Canada
 Nathaniel (Popp), Archbishop of Detroit and the Romanian Episcopate
 Nikon (Liolin), Archbishop of Boston, New England, and the Albanian Archdiocese
 Benjamin (Peterson), Archbishop of San Francisco and the West
 Alejo (Pacheco y Vera), Archbishop of Mexico City and Mexico
 Melchisedek (Pleska), Archbishop of Pittsburgh and Western Pennsylvania
 Mark (Maymon), Archbishop of Philadelphia and Eastern Pennsylvania
 Irénée (Rochon), Archbishop of Ottawa and the Archdiocese of Canada
 Michael (Dahulich), Archbishop of New York and New Jersey 
 Alexander (Golitsin), Archbishop of Dallas, the South and the Bulgarian Diocese
 David (Mahaffey), Bishop of Sitka and Alaska
 Paul (Gassios), Bishop of Chicago and the Midwest
 Irineu (Duvlea), Bishop of Dearborn Heights (Romanian Episcopate)
 Daniel (Brum), Bishop of Santa Rosa (Diocese of the West)

References

Sources
 Derived, in part, with permission from List of American bishops at OrthodoxWiki.
 Greek Orthodox Archdiocese of America
 Hierarchs of the Greek Orthodox Church, Orthodox Research Institute.
 , Orthodox Church in America (OCA Website).

Eastern Orthodox bishops by country
 
 
Eastern Orthodox bishops
Eastern Orthodox bishops
United States
Bishops
Bishops